Daouda Toure (born 30 April 2000) is a Malian footballer who last played for Al Dhafra.

Career statistics

Club

Notes

References

2000 births
Living people
Malian footballers
Malian expatriate footballers
Association football midfielders
UAE Pro League players
UAE First Division League players
FC Pyunik players
Al Dhafra FC players
Al Urooba Club players
Expatriate footballers in Armenia
Malian expatriate sportspeople in Armenia
Expatriate footballers in the United Arab Emirates
Malian expatriate sportspeople in the United Arab Emirates
Sportspeople from Bamako
21st-century Malian people